Luz is the name of two places in the Bible.

Luz may also refer to:

Arts and entertainment 

 Luz (Luz Casal album), 1982
 Luz (Cuca Roseta album), 2017
 Luz (No Te Va Gustar album), 2021
 Luz (2018 film), a German horror film
 Luz (2019 film), a Colombian drama film
 Luz (2020 film), an American LGBT romantic drama film

People
 Luz (name), including a list of people and fictional characters with the given name, nickname or surname
 Luz (cartoonist) (born 1972), pen name of French cartoonist Rénald Luzier

Places
 Luz, Minas Gerais, Brazil, a municipality
 Roman Catholic Diocese of Luz, in the city of Luz in the ecclesiastical province of Belo Horizonte
 Luz (Santa Cruz da Graciosa), Portugal, a civil parish in the Azores
 Luz, a parish of Mourão, Alentejo, Portugal

Transportation
 Luz Station, a railway station in São Paulo, Brazil
 Luz (São Paulo Metro), a metro station in São Paulo
 Luz (CPTM),  a commuter rail and intercity rail station in São Paulo
 LUZ, IATA airport code for Lublin Airport, Poland

Other uses
 Luz (bone), a bone in the spinal column
 Luz (missile), the first missile built in Israel
 Luz (nut), the Aramaic and Arabic name for almond
 BrightSource Energy, formerly Luz II Ltd
 Larger urban zone, or LUZ, a measure of population and expanse of metropolitan areas in Europe
 University of Zulia, known as LUZ, in Venezuela

See also
 La Luz (disambiguation)
 De Luz (disambiguation)
 Luz i Madh, Albania
 Luz i Vogël, Albania
 Palácio da Luz, former head office of the government of Ceará state, Brazil